The name blueberry bee may refer to one of several bee species used to pollinate blueberries:

The "southeastern blueberry bee", Habropoda laboriosa
The "Maine blueberry bee", Osmia atriventris
Osmia ribifloris, native to western North America